Arthur is a common masculine given name.

Arthur may also refer to:

People
For people and fictional characters with the surname, see Arthur (surname).

People known by the mononym include:

King Arthur, legendary British monarch
Arthur Melo, Brazilian footballer known simply as Arthur
Arthur I, Duke of Brittany (1187–1203)
Arthur II, Duke of Brittany (1261–1312)
Arthur III, Duke of Brittany (1393–1458)
Arthur, Prince of Wales (1486–1502)
Prince Arthur, Duke of Connaught and Strathearn (1850–1942), seventh child of Queen Victoria
Prince Arthur of Connaught (1883–1938), a grandson of Queen Victoria
Arthur (TV presenter) (born 1966), French presenter, producer, and comedian

Arts and entertainment

Music
Arthur (band), a side project of MxPx
Arthur (magazine), publication devoted to avant-garde music
Arthur (Or the Decline and Fall of the British Empire), a 1969 album by The Kinks
"Arthur" (The Kinks song)
"Arthur" (Badfinger song)
Arthur the King, a 2001 album by Maddy Prior

Characters

Arthur, a character in the 1991 American coming-of-age comedy-drama movie My Girl
Arthur (plant), a running gag in MAD Magazine
Arthur le fantôme justicier, a fictional character in the comics of Jean Cézard
Sir Arthur (Ghosts 'n Goblins), the main character of Ghosts 'n Goblins video game series
Arthur (Soulcalibur), a minor character in the Soulcalibur video game
Arthur (The Tick), the sidekick of superhero The Tick
Arthur the Artificial Intelligence, a character from the Journeyman Project computer games
Arthur the chimpanzee, from Lillian Hoban's children's books
 Arthur, a fictional character from the TV series Thomas and Friends
Arthur Read, a fictional anthropomorphic aardvark created by Marc Brown
Arthur Morgan  (Red Dead), the main character of Red Dead Redemption 2
Arthur Sleep, a character from the children's TV series Gigglebiz
Arthur Watts, a character in the animated web series RWBY

Film and television
Arthur (TV series), an animated children's television series based on the Arthur Read character
Arthur's Missing Pal, a 2006 animated film
Arthur (1981 film), an Oscar-winning 1981 film starring Dudley Moore
Arthur 2: On the Rocks, a 1988 sequel
Arthur (2011 film), a 2011 remake starring Russell Brand
King Arthur (2004 film), a 2004 film
Arthur! and the Square Knights of the Round Table, an Australian animated series
King Arthur and the Knights of Justice (TV series)
King Arthur's Disasters, a British animated series
Arthur and the Great Adventure:
Arthur and the Invisibles, a 2006 animated film
Arthur and the Revenge of Maltazard, a 2009 animated film
Arthur 3: The War of the Two Worlds, a 2010 animated film
Arthur Christmas, a 2011 animated film

Other uses in arts and entertainment
Arthur (Brown book series), a children's educational publications by Marc Brown
Arthur (Besson book series), a franchise of children's media based on works by Luc Besson
Arthur, 1989 novel by Stephen R. Lawhead, the third in the Pendragon Cycle
Arthur: The Quest for Excalibur, a 1989 computer game made by Infocom

Places

Australia
Port Arthur, Tasmania

Canada
Arthur (electoral district), Manitoba, former provincial electoral division
Arthur, Ontario
Port Arthur, Ontario
Rural Municipality of Arthur, Manitoba

China
Port Arthur, the former name of Lüshunkou

New Zealand
Arthur's Pass, a township in the Southern Alps of the South Island

United States
Arthur, Illinois
Arthur, Indiana
Arthur, Iowa
Arthur, Missouri
Arthur, Nebraska
Arthur, Nevada
Arthur, North Dakota
Arthur, Ohio
Arthur, Oklahoma
Arthur, Tennessee
Arthur, West Virginia
Arthur, Wisconsin, a town
Arthur, Grant County, Wisconsin, an unincorporated community
Arthur County, Nebraska
Port Arthur, Texas
Port Arthur, Wisconsin, an unincorporated community

Other uses
2597 Arthur, an asteroid
Arthur (dog), an Ecuadorian street dog
Arthur (newspaper), a student newspaper at Trent University, Canada
Arthur (operating system)
Arthur (racehorse), runner-up in the 1840 Grand National
ARTHUR (radar), ARTillery HUnting Radar
Arthur Retail, company, acquired by JDA Software in 1998
Arthur, the first open parabolic satellite dish, at the Goonhilly Satellite Earth Station

See also
Arthur's, a 19th-century British gentlemen's club
Arthur's Magazine, a 19th-century American literary magazine
Arthurs (disambiguation)
Clan Arthur, a Scottish clan
King Arthur (disambiguation)
Tropical Storm Arthur
Arturo (disambiguation)
Artur
Author